Kurt Karl Alexander Oscar Boeck (10 June 1855 – 4 October 1933) was a German theater artist, and mountaineer who travelled across South Asia in the 1890s, photographed, and wrote on his experiences.

Boeck was born in Antonienhütte where his father was a steel mill owner. He studied philosophy and science while also performing at the Berlin National Theater. He took part in a lead role in "Holbach" directed by Theodor Döring which was well received leading to his being offered a position by Bernhard Pollini. He however decided to return to try and complete his chemistry studies in Göttingen. He received a doctorate in 1879 for his thesis on disulfonic acid of anthracene. He then trained in acting under Karl Gustav Berndal and Heinrich Oberländer at the Dresden court theater. He grew in stature after the retirement of Carl Ferdinand Koberstein and became a teacher in the performing arts at the Royal Conservatory in Dresden in 1884. He moved to Kassel the next year and in 1887 he took up an offer to join on an expedition to Persia and the Caucasus. He travelled to the Himalayas on his own in 1890 along with Tyrol glacier guide Hans Kerner. He took photographs and collected artefacts and specimens of natural history for various German museums. In 1888 he started a photo studio in Rostock. He made several trip to India in 1893, 1895, and 1898–99 and began to give lectures on his travels and write books.

References

External links 
 (1934) Himalaya-Leider und Bilder
 (1925) Indische Wunderwelt : Reisen und Erlebnisse in Britisch-Indien und auf Ceylon. Leipzig: H. Haessel Verlag.
 (1922) Im Banne des Everest
 (1903) Durch Indien ins verschlossene Land Nepal
 (1900) Indische Gletscherfahrten--Reisen und Erlebnisse im Himalaja

1855 births
1933 deaths
German theatre people
German mountain climbers